The Bailey House is a historic house in Ipswich, Massachusetts.  It was built sometime between 1893 and 1910 to serve as the home and office Doctor Bailey, a prominent local physician.  It is sited on a hill overlooking the central downtown area of Ipswich.  The -story house is one of the most elaborate examples of Queen Anne/Colonial Revival architecture in central Ipswich.  Roughly rectangular in plan, a veranda embellished with Colonial Revival details wraps around the north and west sides of the house.  The central portion of the front is a protruding bay that also rises up through the bottom of the roof and is topped by a turret shaped gable extension.  It is flanked on either side by small gable dormers.

The house was listed on the National Register of Historic Places in 1980.

See also
National Register of Historic Places listings in Ipswich, Massachusetts
National Register of Historic Places listings in Essex County, Massachusetts

References

Houses in Ipswich, Massachusetts
National Register of Historic Places in Ipswich, Massachusetts
Houses on the National Register of Historic Places in Essex County, Massachusetts